is a Japanese manga series written and illustrated by Kozueko Morimoto. It was serialized in Japan by Shueisha in the magazine You and was collected in 12 tankōbon volumes. The series follows the adventures of Ichiko Hanamori, a young woman who, while always dressing in lolita fashion, is also a homicide detective for the Tokyo Metropolitan Police. While inexperienced and often bumbling, she solves crimes using her sense of smell, which surpasses that of the best police dog. The title refers first, to the Japanese slang term for police detective (deka), and second, to a word play on Ichiko's name.

The series has been adapted into a television series starring Mikako Tabe as Ichiko that aired in 2011, and which was followed by several TV specials, one of which was set in Paris.

Television series
 Mikako Tabe as Ichiko Hanamori ("Wanko")
 Ikki Sawamura as Kan'ichi Shigemura ("Shige")
 Yūya Tegoshi as Ryūta Kirishima ("Kiri")
 Mitsuru Fukikoshi as Yūki Komatsubara ("Koma")
 Takeshi Masu as Jirō Monma ("Boss")
 Kōji Ōkura as Seishirō Yanagi ("Yana")
 Hidehiko Ishizuka as Jun Wada ("Chanko")
 Kensei Mikami as Duke Tanaka
 Shirō Sano as Taiichi Igarashi ("Gara")
 Tomorō Taguchi as Kazumasa Taguchi
 Shirō Itō as Police Commissioner Matsuda
 Naomi Watanabe as Kotomi Aoki

References

External links 
  

2008 manga
Japanese television dramas based on manga
Japanese drama television series
Josei manga
Television shows set in France
2011 Japanese television series debuts
2011 Japanese television series endings
Nippon TV dramas
Lolita fashion
Television shows written by Kazuhiko Ban
Shueisha franchises